The 1991–92 Princeton Tigers men's basketball team represented Princeton University in intercollegiate college basketball during the 1991–92 NCAA Division I men's basketball season. The head coach was Pete Carril and the team co-captains were Matt Eastwick, Sean Jackson and George Leftwich. The team played its home games in the Jadwin Gymnasium on the University campus in Princeton, New Jersey.  The team was the champion of the Ivy League, which earned them an invitation to the 64-team 1992 NCAA Division I men's basketball tournament where they were seeded eleventh in the East Region.  This was the team's fourth consecutive appearance in the NCAA basketball tournament after having lost in the first round by a total of seven points in the prior three years.

Using the Princeton offense, the team posted a 22–6 overall record, which included a fifteen-game winning streak, and a 12–2 conference record. A streak of fourteen consecutive Syracuse points by Lawrence Moten sealed Princeton's fate in the second half.

The team was led by first team All-Ivy League selections Sean Jackson, who gave Princeton its fourth consecutive Ivy League Men's Basketball Player of the Year awardee.  Rick Hielscher earned Ivy League Men's Basketball Rookie of the Year honors.  The team won the fourth of twelve consecutive national statistical championships in scoring defense with a 48.9 points allowed average.

References

Princeton Tigers men's basketball seasons
Princeton Tigers
Prince
Prince
Princeton